NGC 7501 is an elliptical galaxy located in the constellation Pisces. It was discovered on September 2, 1864 by the astronomer Albert Marth. It is a member of the Pegasus II cluster of galaxies. A radio source has been detected within one minute of arc of the position of NGC 7501.

References

External links 
 

Pisces (constellation)
7501
Elliptical galaxies